N-t-BOC-MDMA is a chemical compound which can be both a synthetic precursor to, or a prodrug of the empathogenic drug MDMA. It was first identified in Australia in 2015 as a seizure by customs, and has subsequently been found in China, the Netherlands and other European countries. Originally it was thought to be intended as a non-illegal form of MDMA which could be easily converted into the prohibited final product after importation, however one seizure by police found N-t-BOC-MDMA in the process of being pressed into pills, and experiments with simulated gastric fluid confirmed that it can be broken down to MDMA by human stomach acid. Similar N-protected compounds such as N-t-BOC-methamphetamine, N-p-tosyl-methamphetamine, N-t-BOC-ketamine, N-t-BOC-norketamine and N-methoxycarbonyl-MDA have also been encountered by law enforcement.

Legal status 
N-t-BOC-MDMA has been specifically listed as an illicit drug in Singapore and South Korea, but is also controlled by general drug analogue provisions in Australia and various European countries.

See also
 Gabapentin enacarbil
 Meprobamate

References 

Substituted amphetamines
Designer drugs
Entactogens and empathogens